John Edward Bollington, also known as Jan Bollington (born 1892) was an English football player and coach.

Career
Born in Belper, Bollington played in the Football League for Southend United and Brighton & Hove Albion. He joined Southend in August 1919 from the Army, leaving them in September 1920 to sign for Brighton. He suffered a broken leg during an FA Cup match against Cardiff City while attempting to tackle opposition forward Jimmy Gill. The injury ultimately ended his playing career, while Cardiff held a benefit match in November 1921 against Brighton to raise funds for him.

He later became a football manager in the Netherlands; he was in charge of amateur club CVV Vriendenschaar between 1923 and 1931, having previously coached De Zwaluwen. He was also in charge of the Dutch national team for one match in 1924, leading them to a 2–1 win over South Africa.

References

1892 births
Year of death missing
English footballers
Association football wing halves
English football managers
English expatriate football managers
People from Belper
Footballers from Derbyshire
Walsall F.C. players
Southend United F.C. players
Brighton & Hove Albion F.C. players
English Football League players
Expatriate football managers in the Netherlands
Netherlands national football team managers
English expatriate sportspeople in the Netherlands